Bug Adventure is an educational video game about bugs by Knowledge Adventure. It was released in 1994 for MS-DOS and Macintosh, then for Windows in 2015. The interactive nature almanac and encyclopedia presents facts and media related to bugs (e.g., insects and spiders). It includes a quiz game.

References 

1994 video games
DOS games
Educational video games
Classic Mac OS games
Video games developed in the United States
Windows games
Children's educational video games
Video games about insects
Multiplayer and single-player video games